Ysbyty Ifan (often formerly anglicised as Yspytty Ifan) is a small, historic village and community in the Conwy County Borough of Wales. The population in 2011 was 196 in 76 households (29 household spaces had no usual residents), over 79% of the population were able to speak Welsh. It has one of the smallest populations of any Welsh community, the smallest being Ganllwyd. It is in the electoral ward of Uwch Conwy.

History

Ysbyty Ifan, until about 1190, was known as Dôl Gynwal (Welsh for Cynwal's Meadow). Then, it came to the attention of the Knights of St John, the Order of Hospitallers, who set up a hospital to care for pilgrims and also to be a hostel for them on their journeys (Ysbyty Ifan means hospital of St John). Ysbyty Ifan was on the ancient pilgrimage routes, for example, from Bangor Is Coed (Bangor-on-Dee) to Holyhead and Bardsey Island and the Cistercian Way between Aberconwy and Cymer. It is centrally located among a significant number of important pilgrimage destinations of the Middle Ages, see the map which shows only some of them.

In the 15th century, the Red Bandits of Mawddwy used Ysbyty Ifan as a hideout, taking advantage of the Knights' privilege of sanctuary.

The hospital was abolished in 1540 during the Dissolution of the Monasteries; the Church of St John is built on the site of the old hospital, and it contains a number of remnants that tell of the area's history. Effigies in the church are said to depict Rhys Fawr ap Maredudd (fl. 1485–1510), a local nobleman who served Henry VII at the Battle of Bosworth, his wife Lowri, and his son Robert, chaplain to Cardinal Wolsey.

There is a bridge over the Afon Conwy in the centre of the village

Notable associations
The poet William Cynwal was buried in Ysbyty Ifan in about 1588. He was a disciple of Gruffudd Hiraethog and took part in the second Caerwys eisteddfod in 1568.
Tomos Prys, sailor, buccaneer and poet, was buried in Ysbyty Ifan on 23 August 1634.
Abraham Lincoln's great, great grandfather, John Morris, lived in Bryn Gwyn, a farmhouse in Ysbyty Ifan which is now derelict. His daughter emigrated to Pennsylvania in the United States with a group of Quakers in the 17th century.
Siôn Dafydd Berson (c.1675-1769), poet, clog maker and lay reader, was buried in Ysbyty Ifan cemetery in 1769. Dafydd is mainly remembered as the person who taught Twm o'r Nant to read and write. The inscription on his grave, by Twm o'r Nant, says "Galar, i'r ddaear ddu - aeth athraw..." (Oh grief, into the black earth - goes the teacher...)
Gwallter Mechain, the Welsh bard, was made curate of Ysbyty Ifan in 1799.
Clough Williams-Ellis designed Voelas, a small country house for Colonel John Wynne-Finch in the late 1950s. The house is a Grade II* listed building and its gardens and grounds are listed, also at Grade II* on the Cadw/ICOMOS Register of Parks and Gardens of Special Historic Interest in Wales.

Today
Ysbyty Ifan has a primary school with two classrooms and a cafeteria. The village also has a bakery shop, a post office, a milk shop and a rugby union pitch with a children's playground.

The Ysbyty Ifan Estate is the largest single estate looked after by the National Trust. The area of the estate is over 8,000 hectares and includes moorland, river valleys and hill farms. The Migneint is an area of moorland and bog designated as a Site of Special Scientific Interest (SSSI). The Trust is responsible for a number of holiday cottages within the estate including Foel-Gopyn, which is off the grid.

There are also a number of other places of interest near Ysbyty Ifan, so the area attracts a large number of visitors including walkers, especially during the summer months.

Ysbyty Ifan is part of the Uwch Conwy ward for elections to Conwy County Borough Council.

References

External links 

 Ysbyty Ifan timeline
 A Vision of Britain Through Time
 British Listed Buildings
 Clwyd Churches
 Genuki
 Geograph
 Office for National Statistics

 
Listed buildings in Conwy County Borough
Registered historic parks and gardens in Conwy County Borough